TV Sir Tristram (L3505) formerly (RFA Sir Tristam), is a Round Table class logistics landing ship that was converted to Special Forces Training Vessel in 2008. She was launched in 1966, and accepted into British Army service in 1967. As with others of her class, she was transferred to the Royal Fleet Auxiliary in 1970, and was crewed by British officers and Hong Kong Chinese sailors. The ship saw service in the Falklands War of 1982, and was badly damaged at Fitzroy on 8 June.

Early service
From completion to early 1970 Sir Tristam was managed by British India Steam Navigation Company
In 1977 Sir Tristram was used as a guest ship for the Queens Silver Jubilee Fleet Review at Spithead in the Solent.

Falklands War

In April 1982 Sir Tristram was diverted from Belize to the Falkland Islands to take part in Operation Corporate, the British effort to retake the Falkland Islands.

At approximately 14:00 local time the decks were strafed and two crew were killed. A 500 lb bomb penetrated the deck, but failed to explode immediately, allowing the remaining crew to be evacuated. Following the later explosion, Sir Tristram was abandoned. Immediately following the end of the conflict, Sir Tristram was towed to Port Stanley, where she was used as an accommodation ship. Sir Tristram then returned to the United Kingdom in 1983 on a heavy lift ship and was extensively rebuilt.

Rebuilt

Following the rebuild, Sir Tristram re-entered active service in 1985, and saw service in the Gulf War, and the Balkan conflicts of the 1990s. The ship supported relief operations for Hurricane Mitch off Central America. In 2000 the ship was deployed to Sierra Leone in support of British operations there, followed by a cruise to the Baltic Sea in support of mine countermeasure vessels. In 2003 the ship was deployed as part of the largest British fleet for 20 years in support of the invasion of Iraq.

The ship was decommissioned on 17 December 2005 but continues to be used for training purposes by the Special Boat Service and other elements of the UK Special Forces group. She is now based at Portland Harbour.

References

External links

Round Table-class landing ships logistics
1966 ships
Falklands War naval ships of the United Kingdom
Maritime incidents in 1982
Ships built on the River Tyne